The Zacherlhaus is a residential and business building designed by Jože Plečnik and built between 1903 and 1905 in the 1st district of Vienna, the central district of Innere Stadt (at Brandstätte 6 / Wildpretmarkt 2–4 / Bauernmarkt 2).

The construction was commissioned by Johann Evangelist Zacherl, son of the industrial magnate Johann Zacherl, who built the Zacherlfabrik. It was one of the first modern buildings erected at the Wildpretmarkt in Vienna's city centre. The façade is made of polished grey granite plates; the artistically executed cornice is also noteworthy. The figure of Archangel Michael on the façade is the work of Ferdinand Andri, while the atlantes were designed by Franz Metzner. The oval-shaped stairwell features a lamp that resembles an insect; this is a reference to insecticide, the production of which had made the Zacherl family rich.

In 1949, it was necessary to restore the Zacherlhaus after it had been damaged during World War II.

Today, the Zacherlhaus is a listed building. It is one of the most important examples of the work of the Otto Wagner-school. It belongs to Johann Zacherl's descendants and is used as office space.

Gallery

References 
 Felix Czeike: Historisches Lexikon Wien. Band 5. Kremayr & Scheriau, Wien 1995, .

External links 

 nextroom Architektur datenbank - Zacherl-Haus 
 ORF Wien - Zacherlhaus als erstes modernes Haus 

Buildings and structures in Innere Stadt
Residential buildings in Vienna
Office buildings in Vienna
Art Nouveau architecture in Vienna
Art Nouveau apartment buildings
Art Nouveau commercial buildings
Residential buildings completed in 1905
Commercial buildings completed in 1905
Jože Plečnik buildings
1905 establishments in Austria
20th-century architecture in Austria